Pangnirtung (Inuinnaqtun: Pangniqtuuq) is a territorial electoral district (riding) for the Legislative Assembly of Nunavut, Canada.

The riding consists of the community of Pangnirtung.

Election results

1999 election

2004 election

2008 election

2011 by-election

2013 election

2017 election

References

External links
Website of the Legislative Assembly of Nunavut

Electoral districts of Qikiqtaaluk Region
1999 establishments in Nunavut